Coleophora kudrosella is a moth of the family Coleophoridae. It is found on Honshu island of Japan.

References

kudrosella
Moths described in 1988
Moths of Japan